Chingon is a band from Austin, Texas. Their sound is heavily influenced by Mexican rock, mariachi, ranchera, and Texan rock 'n roll music.

History
Chingon was formed by film director Robert Rodriguez to record songs for his 2003 film Once Upon a Time in Mexico. They contributed to Mexico and Mariachis, a compilation album from Rodriguez' Mariachi Trilogy, and released their debut album, Mexican Spaghetti Western, in 2007. The band's name comes from a Mexican slang term, chingón, loosely but closely enough meaning "badass" and/or "the shit".

Chingon also contributed the song "Malagueña Salerosa" to Quentin Tarantino's Kill Bill Volume 2 — which Rodriguez scored — and a live performance by the band was included on the film's DVD release. They also contributed to the soundtrack for his next film, a collaboration with Tarantino, Grindhouse, doing a cover of the film's opening theme, re-titling it "Cherry's Dance of Death". Rodríguez plays guitar in the band. The band has also made an appearance on "George Buys a Vow", an episode of the US sitcom George Lopez.

On December 12, 2015, Chingon performed as the house band for Lucha Underground during a Season Two taping. Rodriguez is an Executive Producer for the series and it airs on his network, El Rey Network.

Band members
 Robert Rodriguez – guitar
 Alex Ruiz – vocals
 Mark del Castillo – guitar, vocals
 Rick del Castillo – guitar, vocals
 Albert Besteiro – bass guitar
 Carmelo Torres – percussion
 Mike Zeoli – drums
When playing without Robert Rodriguez, the band is known as Del Castillo.

Guest artists include:
 Patricia Vonne (Rodriguez's sister co-wrote and performed on "Severina")
 Salma Hayek (performed "Siente Mi Amor")
 Tito Larriva (wrote and performed "Alacran y Pistolero")
 Nataly Pena

Discography

Albums
Mexican Spaghetti Western (2004)

Soundtrack appearances
Once Upon a Time in Mexico (2003)
Mexico and Mariachis (2004)
Kill Bill Volume 2 (2004)
Grindhouse: Planet Terror (2007)
Hell Ride (2008)
Machete (2010)

References

External links

 Official website

Mexican rock music groups
Robert Rodriguez